Mark Tyler may refer to:

 Mark Tyler (footballer) (born 1977), English football player
 Mark Tyler, New Zealand musician and part of Salmonella Dub
 Mark Tyler, mayor of Kirtland, Ohio

See also
 Marc Tyler (born 1988), American football player